Bojana Dornig (born 7 August 1960 in Ljubljana) is a former Slovenian alpine skier who competed for Yugoslavia. 

Dornig had two top-10 finishes in the FIS Alpine Ski World Cup, she finished 7th in Piancavallo and 9th in Bormio, Italy, both in December 1980. She was chosen as the Slovenian Sportwoman of the Year 1981.

References

1960 births
Living people
Slovenian female alpine skiers
Yugoslav female alpine skiers